This is a list of Oman Twenty20 International cricketers. A Twenty20 International is an international cricket match between two representative teams, each having ODI status, as determined by the International Cricket Council (ICC). A Twenty20 International is played under the rules of Twenty20 cricket. The list is arranged in the order in which each player won his first Twenty20 cap. Where more than one player won his first Twenty20 cap in the same match, those players are listed alphabetically by surname.

Oman were first granted T20I status in July 2015, after making the top six teams at the 2015 World Twenty20 Qualifier. The team's debut in the format came in its last match of the tournament, the fifth-place play-off against Afghanistan. Oman lost the match, played at Castle Avenue, Dublin, by five wickets. Oman were guaranteed to maintain their T20I status until 2019. In April 2018, the ICC granted full Twenty20 International (T20I) status to all its members, starting from 1 January 2019. Therefore, Oman will retain its T20I status.

Key

List of players

Last updated 21 November 2022

See also 
List of Oman ODI cricketers

References 

Oman